Delta Air Lines operates 915 commercial aircraft, making it the second largest airline fleet in the world. In the past, Delta used to purchase or lease older generation aircraft and fly them for sometimes up to an age of over 30 years, much longer than most other major airlines. In 2011 however, Delta began a massive fleet-renewal effort with orders for new and modern narrow- and wide-body aircraft. As a result, Delta today still flies the second-oldest fleet among US big 4 international airlines (American, Delta, Southwest & United), however with the average fleet age reduced to 14.8 years.

Fleet overview
Delta's fleet consists of 899 Airbus and Boeing aircraft. 493 Boeing aircraft make up about 56% of Delta's fleet, while its 406 Airbus aircraft make up about 44%. Its 342 aircraft on order are both for Airbus and Boeing aircraft types. Its 735 narrow-body aircraft comprise about 83% of its fleet, while its 151 wide-body aircraft comprise the remaining 17%.

Delta operates the largest fleets of the Airbus A220, the Boeing 717, the Boeing 757, and the largest passenger fleet of the Boeing 767 worldwide. Alongside United Airlines, it is one of only two airlines worldwide operating the Boeing 767-400ER.

Delta primarily uses narrow-body aircraft for its domestic flights within the United States and international flights from the United States to Canada, Mexico, the Caribbean, and some European destinations. Most of its Boeing 717 aircraft are based in Hartsfield–Jackson Atlanta International Airport and are mainly used for short-haul flights. Its Airbus A220, Airbus A320, Boeing 737 and Boeing 757 aircraft are used for short-haul flights and medium-haul transcontinental flights. Delta primarily uses its wide-body aircraft on long-haul flights to Africa, Asia, Europe, Oceania, and South America. Its Airbus A330s, Boeing 767-300ERs, and Boeing 767-400ERs mainly operate on flights to Europe, while the Airbus A350-900 mainly operates on flights to Asia and Oceania.

Delta has one of the oldest fleets of any United States airline, with an average fleet age of 14.8 years as of December 2022. Its oldest aircraft types are the Airbus A320-200, Boeing 767-300ER, and Boeing 757-200, which have an average age of 26, 25.4, and 24.4 years, respectively. Its youngest aircraft types are the Boeing 737-900ER, Airbus A350-900, Airbus A321-200, Airbus A330-900, and Airbus A220-300, which have an average age of 5.6, 3.7, 3.1, 1.6, and 1 years respectively.

In 2012, Delta began fleet renewal with an agreement to lease all 88 of AirTran's Boeing 717s from their parent company Southwest, with deliveries between 2013 and 2015. These aircraft would allow Delta to retire DC-9s and smaller regional jets and turboprops.
In September 2013, Delta ordered 30 A321, its first order with Airbus in more than two decades. This order would later be incrementally increased with 15 more in 2014, an additional 37 in 2016, and 40 more in 2017. In addition, Delta ordered 100 A321neo aircraft in December 2017 to replace its aging McDonnell Douglas MD-80/90 series and Boeing 757s.

Delta continued its fleet renewal project with orders for 25 A350-900s and 25 A330-900s aircraft (ordered November 2014) and 95 Airbus A220 (both the -100 and -300 variant) aircraft. In September 2019, Delta assumed purchase rights for 10 A350-900s from LATAM as part of a deal to acquire a 20% equity stake in LATAM Airlines Group.

In a memo on March 18, 2020, to company employees, Delta CEO Ed Bastian announced that as a result of the COVID-19 pandemic impact on airline operations, the company would accelerate the retirement of the remaining MD-88 and MD-90 aircraft, as well as some older Boeing 767s. All the MD-88 and MD-90 aircraft were retired on June 2, 2020, with its final revenue flight from Washington-Dulles to Atlanta on MD-88 (DL88), and from Houston to Atlanta on MD-90 (DL90), becoming the last operator to fly the MD-90 and as well the last major U.S. airline to fly the MD-88. The retirement of its MD-88s and MD-90s officially ended Delta's 80-year era of flying Douglas and McDonnell Douglas aircraft, which started in 1940 with the DC-3.

The final 777 revenue flight was from New York-JFK to Los Angeles (DL8777) on October 31, 2020. When Delta announced its June quarter results, it revealed plans to retire the 737-700, as well as accelerate 767-300ER and A320-200 retirements. In September 2020, Delta announced through its SEC filing its plan to retire all Boeing 717-200 and will be phasing out their Delta Connection Bombardier CRJ-200s aircraft, by the year 2025. Delta's Boeing 767-300ER aircraft were also set to be retired by 2025, but this date has not been commented on.

In April 2021, Delta added 25 incremental A321neo orders for a total of 125 firm orders and 100 options to begin delivery in 2022. They also accelerated delivery dates for two A350-900s and one A330-900 to 2022. In July 2021, Delta entered into agreements to lease 7 used A350-900s and acquire 29 used Boeing 737-900ERs to complement fleet renewal, with aircraft entering service from 2022 after modifications to Delta cabin configurations.  In August 2021, Delta increased its A321neo firm order by another 30 for a total of 155 firm orders and 70 options.

Current fleet
, Delta Air Lines operates the following aircraft:

Gallery

Fleet history

Notes

References

Further reading

Delta Air Lines
Delta Air Lines